The Néez of Gan (also: Nez) is a left tributary of the Gave de Pau, in Béarn (Pyrénées-Atlantiques), in the Southwest of France. It flows into the Gave downstream from Pau.

Name 
The Néez (aka Nez, Néès, Neys...) shares its name with another tributary, the Néez of Saint-Créac, in the south of Lourdes.

This name is a variant of the Pyrenean hydronym Léez (alternation l / n).

Geography 
The Néez rises on the territory of Rébénacq; it is fed by the brook of Houndarnas, a small brook flowing from the slopes of Sévignacq, and by several resurgences of the gave d'Ossau in the south of the village.

The Néez flows north into the Gave de Pau in Jurançon.

Départements and towns 
 Pyrénées-Atlantiques: Rébénacq, Gan, Bosdarros et Jurançon.

References

Rivers of France
Rivers of Pyrénées-Atlantiques
Rivers of Nouvelle-Aquitaine